Grand Panetier may refer to:

 Grand Panetier of Croatia, a title held by the House of Cseszneky (Cseszneky de Milvány et Csesznek)
 Grand Panetier of France, a title held by the Cossé de Brissac family
 Grand Panetier of Normandy, a dignity in the Duchy of Normandy, occasionally hereditary